A turbosteamer is a term used by BMW to describe a combined cycle engine. Waste heat energy from the internal combustion engine would be used to generate steam (see Waste Heat Recovery Unit) for a steam engine which would create supplemental power for the vehicle. The turbosteamer device is affixed to the exhaust and cooling system. It salvages the heat wasted in the exhaust and radiator (as much as 80% of heat energy) and uses a steam piston or turbine to relay that power to the crankshaft. Unlike gasoline-electric hybrids, these gains increase at higher, steadier speeds.

Timescale
BMW has been the pioneer of this concept as early as 2000 under the direction of Dr. Raymond Freymann, and while they were designing this system to fit to most current BMW models, the technology didn't reach production.

See also
 COGAS
 Cogeneration
 Combined cycle
 Exhaust heat recovery system
 Still engine
 Turbo-compound engine

Publications
 R. Freymann, W. Strobl, A. Obieglo: The Turbosteamer: A System Introducing the Principle of Cogeneration in Automotive Applications. Motortechnische Zeitschrift, MTZ 05/2008 Jahrgang 69, pp.404-412.

References

External links
Gizmag article discussing BMW's turbosteamer
Article on BMW's alternative Combined Cycle Hybrid technology
Looking for the next gram. BMW Group. Retrieved 5 December 2011.

Engine technology
Steam power